The lesser blue-eared starling or lesser blue-eared glossy-starling (Lamprotornis chloropterus) is a species of starling in the family Sturnidae.
It is found in Benin, Burkina Faso, Burundi, Cameroon, the Central African Republic, Chad, the Democratic Republic of the Congo, Eritrea, Ethiopia, Gambia, Ghana, Guinea, Guinea-Bissau, Ivory Coast, Kenya, Liberia, Malawi, Mali, Mozambique, Namibia, Nigeria, Senegal, Sierra Leone, South Sudan, Sudan, Tanzania, Togo, Uganda, Zambia, and Zimbabwe.

References

External links
Lesser blue-eared glossy-starling - Species text in The Atlas of Southern African Birds

lesser blue-eared starling
Birds of Sub-Saharan Africa
lesser blue-eared starling
Taxonomy articles created by Polbot